Villanueva del Campo is a town located in the Province of Zamora, Castile and León, Spain. In ancient Rome, it was called Intercatia.

References

Municipalities of the Province of Zamora